Margzetta Bryantina Frazier (born February 25, 2000) is an American artistic gymnast.  She was a US National Team member from 2017–2018 and was the 2018 Birmingham World Cup silver medalist.  She is currently a member of the UCLA Gymnastics team and is the older sister of eMjae Frazier.

Gymnastics career

Senior elite

2017
In 2017, Frazier competed at the US Classic, where she only competed bars, finishing fourth on the event behind Ragan Smith, Alyona Shchennikova, and Trinity Thomas and tied with Marissa Oakley.

Later that summer, Frazier competed at nationals, where she placed fifth in the all-around and on bars, eighth on beam, and seventh on floor. Due to her performance, she was named to the national team.

In September, Frazier attended world trials. However, after the two days of competition, she was not named to the world championship team.

2018
In February 2018, Frazier was named to represent the US at the Birmingham World Cup. This would be Frazier's first international assignment for the USA. On March 22, Frazier won the silver medal at the Birmingham World Cup, finishing with a score of 53.932 behind Russia's Angelina Melnikova.

Frazier did not plan at competing at nationals in 2018, only doing so at the request of team coordinator Tom Forster. At nationals, she finished thirteenth in the all-around, tied for eleventh on bars with Ragan Smith, tied for eighteenth on beam with Maddie Johnston, and placed tenth on floor.

NCAA
On November 9, 2015, it was announced that Frazier committed to the University of California, Los Angeles for the 2018–19 season.

2018–19 season 
Frazier joined the UCLA Bruins gymnastics team in the 2018–19 season. She primarily competed on uneven bars and floor exercise throughout the season.  At the Pac-12 Championships Frazier helped UCLA come in first and individually she won silver on the uneven bars.  At the NCAA Championships Frazier helped UCLA finish in third place. Frazier made the NCAA All American team on the uneven bars. Frazier was rewarded with multiple Pac-12 Freshman of the Week titles.

2019-2020 season 
Frazier made her collegiate all-around and beam debut at the Collegiate Challenge on January 4, scoring a 39.4. This performance led to her selection for the first-ever Pac-12 Coaches' Award.

Regular season rankings

Personal life 
Frazier was born on February 25, 2000, to parents, William and Tina Frazier. She has three siblings: eMjae and Billie, who are also gymnasts, and Tytan, a soccer player. Tytan and Billie also do track and field. She attended Timber Creek Regional High School and graduated in 2018.

Competitive history

References 

2000 births
American female artistic gymnasts
Living people
UCLA Bruins women's gymnasts
U.S. women's national team gymnasts
African-American female gymnasts
21st-century African-American sportspeople
21st-century African-American women
20th-century African-American sportspeople
20th-century African-American women
20th-century African-American people